Halimadienyl-diphosphate synthase (Rv3377c, halimadienyl diphosphate synthase, tuberculosinol diphosphate synthase, halima-5(6),13-dien-15-yl-diphosphate lyase (cyclizing)) is an enzyme with systematic name halima-5,13-dien-15-yl-diphosphate lyase (decyclizing). This enzyme catalyses the following chemical reaction

 geranylgeranyl diphosphate  tuberculosinyl diphosphate

This enzyme requires Mg2+ for activity.

References

External links 
 

EC 5.5.1